Heron is a surname originating in the British Isles and Normandy during the Middle Ages.

Origin
This name is believed to have more than one origin. In England, it is most commonly derived as nickname for a tall, thin man with long legs from Middle English heiroun/heyron itself coming from Old French hairon. The surname may also be an habitual name; of Old English origin from Harome in North Yorkshire or Norman origin from Le Héron, near Rouen.

In Ireland, this surname is often an Anglicised form of any one of three Irish Gaelic names: "O'hEarain", descendant of the feared one; "O'Huidhrin", descendant of the swarthy one; or "Mac GiollaChiarain", son of the servant of St. Ciaran. The name Heron can also come from Ó Eachthighearna, which means "descendant of the horse lord".

An early recorded spelling of the family name is shown to be that of William de Herun, which was dated 1150, in the "Pipe Rolls of Yorkshire". The name became prominent on the Anglo-Scottish border as a clan of border reivers operating between the late 13th century to the beginning of the 17th century. Today, in the United Kingdom the surname is most commonly found in County Down, Tyne and Wear, Surrey and Lancashire.

Notable people with the surname
Alastair Heron (1915–2009), British author
Alexander Heron (1884–1971), Scottish geologist and Director of the Geological Survey of India
Alexander Heron Jr. (1818–1865), Irish-American businessman
Brian Heron (born 1948), Scottish footballer
Caroline Heron (born 1990), Scottish footballer
Colin Heron (1924–2010), Jamaican cricketer
Craig Heron, Canadian historian
Denis Caulfield Heron (1824–1881), Irish lawyer and politician
Eddie Heron (1910–1985), Irish high diving and springboard diving champion
Edward Thomas Heron (1867–1949), English industrialist and printing entrepreneur
Francis Heron (1853–1914), English footballer
Francis Arthur Heron (1864–1940), English entomologist
Frederick Heron (1944–2010), American NFL footballer
George Heron (1919–2011), President of the Seneca Nation of Indians
Gil Heron (1922–2008), Jamaican footballer
Gilbert Heron (1854–1876), Scottish rugby player
Giles Heron (1504–1540), English politician
Haly Heron (1550–1591), English essayist and soldier
Henry Heron, English soldier
Henry Heron (1675–1730), British politician 
Hubert Heron (1852–1914), English footballer
Jack Heron (1926–2012), American basketball coach
Jacob Heron (born 1999), Australian rules footballer
Jim Heron (born 1940), Canadian politician
Sir John Heron (1470–1522), English courtier during reigns of Henry VII and Henry VIII
John Heron (social scientist) (born 1928), social scientist
Sir Joseph Heron (1809–1889), English lawyer and municipal administrator 
Joyce Heron (1916–1980), English actress
Julia Heron (1897–1977), American set decorator
Justin Herron (born 1995), American football player
Keith Heron (1890–1975), Australian rules footballer
Louis Héron (1746–1796), French revolutionary
Martin Heron, Northern Ireland sculptor
Martin Wilkes Heron (1850–1920), bartender and creator of Southern Comfort
Mary Heron (fl. 1786–1792), English writer
Mary Dorothea Heron (c. 1897 – 1960), first woman to be admitted to the Roll of Solicitors in Ireland
Matilda Heron (1830–1877), popular Irish-American actress
Meredith Heron, Canadian interior designer
Mike Heron (born 1942), Scottish musician and composer
Mustapha Heron (born 1997), American basketball player
Oscar Heron (1896–1933), Irish fighter pilot
Patrick Heron (1736–1803), Scottish politician and banker, MP for Kirkcudbright Stewartry 1795–1803
Patrick Heron (died 1761), Scottish politician, MP for Kirkcudbright Stewartry 1727–41
Patrick Heron (1920–1999), St Ives, Cornwall, painter
Paula Heron, Canadian-American physicist
Percy Heron (1892–1950), Australian rules footballer
Sir Richard Heron, 1st Baronet (1726–1805), Chief Secretary for Ireland
Robert Heron (1764–1807), Scottish writer
Sir Robert Heron, 2nd Baronet (1765–1854), British Whig politician, Member of Parliament (MP) for Great Grimsby 1812–18 and Peterborough 1819–47
Samuel Dalziel Heron (S.D. Heron) (1893–1965), aerospace engineer
Susanna Heron (born 1949), British artist who works primarily between drawing, sculpture, scale and movement
Thomas Heron (1879–1928), Australian trade unionist and politician
Wallace Heron (1924–1990), New Zealand pole vaulter
Edward Heron-Allen (1861–1943), English writer, scientist and Persian scholar
John Heron-Maxwell (1836–1899), Scottish Liberal politician
Gil Scott-Heron (1949–2011), American poet and civil rights activist

References

English-language surnames
Surnames of English origin
Anglicised Irish-language surnames